The Heilbronner Neckarcup is a tennis tournament held in Heilbronn, Germany since 2014. The event is part of the ATP Challenger Tour and is played on outdoor clay courts.

Filip Krajinović is the singles record holder with two titles won.

Past finals

Singles

Doubles

External links
 Official website

 
ATP Challenger Tour
Tennis tournaments in Germany
Clay court tennis tournaments
Recurring sporting events established in 2014